Utopiales is an annual international science fiction festival held in Nantes, France, probably the largest European event for the field. It covers science fiction and fantasy literature, film, fine arts, comics, role-playing games, and animation, from a distinctly European point of view. Founded by Bruno della Chiesa, and run by science fiction museum director Patrick Gyger from 2001 to 2005, it is put on by the "Association du Festival International de Science-Fiction de Nantes".

The festival, run by professional staff, is funded in part by the City of Nantes and has extensive corporate sponsorship, unlike conventions put on by traditional science fiction fandom. One feature of Utopiales is the "Prix Utopia" Grandmaster award, given for overall contribution to science fiction literature. Past winners have included Robert Silverberg, Jack Vance, Brian W. Aldiss, Frederik Pohl, Christopher Priest, and Michael Moorcock.

Editions

References

External links 
 

Science fiction conventions in Europe